This is a list of programs broadcast by ARY Zindagi.

Current programming 
This is the current programming aired on ARY Zindagi.

Reruns of ended series 
Azmaish
Aulaad
Bharaas
Ishqiya
Pardes
Haal-e-Dil
Dunk
Ishq Hai
Rasgullay
Ghar Jamai
The Night Show With Ayaz Samoo
Zingadi with Sajid Hassan

Former programming

Drama series
 Baba Ki Rani
Badbakht
 Bay Dar-o-Deewar Ghar
Dil Haari
 Intikam
 Mere Khwab Lauta Do
 Na Katro Pankh Mere
Phir Wohi Dil
 Socha Na Tha

Drama Soap

 Bahu Begum
Baygunaah
 Behenein Aisi Bhi Hoti Hain
Haal-E-Dil
Hamari Bitiya
Haya Kay Rang
Khushaal Susral
 Manzil Kahin Nahi
 Meka Aur Susral
 Mere Baba Ki Ounchi Haveli
Raja Indar
 Rishtey

Reality/Non-Scripted 
 Breaking Weekend Desi Kuriyan (season 7)
 Eidi Sab Ke Liye
 Life Speaks
 Madventures (season 3)
Naheed Ansari Show
 Salam Zindagi
Showman
 Zindagi with Sajid Hassan

 Acquired programming
Turkey
 Aashiqui Alvida Masoom DulhanIndia
Adaalat
 BeintehaaBigg Boss 11
 Comedy Nights Bachao Killer Karaoke Budnaseeb Comedy Nights with KapilEk Mutthi Aasman
 KhauffPyaar Tune Kya KiyaSarojini - Ek Nayi Pehal Taarak Mehta Ka Ooltah Chashmah The Great Family Drama''

References

Pakistani television-related lists
ARY Zindagi original programming
Original programming by Pakistani television network or channel
Lists of television series by network